Peter Williamson may refer to:

 Peter Williamson (memoirist) (1730–1799), aka "Indian Peter", Scottish memoirist who was part-showman, part-entrepreneur and inventor
 Peter Williamson (footballer) (born 1953), Australian rules footballer
 Peter J. Williamson (1823–1907), Dutch-American architect
 Pete Williamson (1946-1991), Canadian Olympic speed skater